Verel or Verèl is a surname. 

A. J. Verel, American kickboxer
Engin Verel (born 1956), Turkish footballer
Hans Verèl (born 1953), Dutch footballer and manager

See also
Verel-Pragondran and Verel-de-Montbel, two communes in the Savoie department, Rhône-Alpes region, France